Cleckheaton Rugby Football Club is an English rugby union team based in Cleckheaton, West Yorkshire. The club runs four senior sides and twelve junior teams. and the first XV currently plays in North 1 East

History
Cleckheaton first formed a rugby club in 1888 and opted to play Union when rugby league was formed in 1895. The club was suspended at the start of World War One and reformed in 1926.

Club Honours
Yorkshire 1 champions: 2000-01
North Division 1 East champions (2): 2001-02, 2012–13
North 1 v Midlands 1 promotion playoff winners: 2003-04

International Players
Past Cleckheaton players who have gone on to play international rugby include 
 Jeff Butterfield 
 Roger Pickering 
 John Bentley

References

English rugby union teams
1888 establishments in England
Rugby clubs established in 1888
Sport in Kirklees
Cleckheaton